Emil Hoștină (born 31 May 1976) is a Romanian actor.

Partial filmography

 1993: Pro patria - Caporalul
 1993: Cântarea cântărilor
 1994: Pepi si Fifi - Manole
 1996: Prea târziu
 1998: Cortul
 1999: Die letzte Station
 2002: Amen. - Sergeant
 2003: Vlad - Mircea
 2003: Boudica - Arcon
 2003: Examen - Lt. Major militie
 2004: Paranoia 1.0 - Landlord
 2004: Raport despre starea natiunii
 2004: Italiencele - Fane
 2006: What Means Motley? (2006) - Avram
 2006: The Fall - Alexandria's Father / Bandit
 2006: The Wind in the Willows (TV movie) - Mr. Tweed
 2006: Catacombs - Henry
 2008: Silent Wedding - Runcu
 2009: Anacondas: Trail of Blood (TV movie) - Eugene
 2009: The Imaginarium of Doctor Parnassus - Serge
 2009: Ondine - Vladic
 2010: Made in Romania - Sorin Filipescu
 2010: The Wolfman - Gypsy Man / Bear Handler
 2010: Foyle's War - Alex Anokhov
 2010: Bunraku - Follower #1
 2010: Harry Potter and the Deathly Hallows – Part 1 - Death Eater
 2011: Harry Potter and the Deathly Hallows – Part 2 - Death Eater
 2013: The Zero Theorem - Slim Clone
 2013: Utopia - Marius
 2015: Fortitude  - Yuri Lubimov
 2016: Barbarians Rising - Attila
 2016: Marcella'' - Bendek Krol

References

External links

Living people
Romanian male film actors
Romanian male television actors
1976 births
20th-century Romanian male actors
21st-century Romanian male actors
People from Medgidia